The England Athletics Hall of Fame was launched in 2008 with a panel of experts selecting a list of potential inductees for athletics fans and members of the public to vote on.  The Hall of Fame honours those who have made an outstanding contribution to the sport of athletics in England. Each year the public is able to vote on a shortlist of athletes who have been put forward for voting by a panel of experts.

The short list for the public to vote on is drawn up on various criteria, including the following:

Athletes will be selected for the Hall of Fame shortlist based on their contribution to the sport of athletics as well as performance. (This could be as an athlete, coach or some other contributor). An example could be the impact of Roger Bannister's sub-four-minute mile on middle-distance running or Seb Coe’s work for the sport and Olympics.
Nominated athletes must have been retired for a minimum of five years.

Chairman of the Hall of Fame panel is Darren Campbell. Darren himself won Olympic gold in the 4 × 100 m relay and a silver at 200m. He was also European 100m champion and bronze medallist in the World Championships.

Inductees

2008–2010

2008 
Daley Thompson
Sally Gunnell
Lord Coe
Steve Ovett
David Hemery
Sir Roger Bannister
David Holding
David Coleman
Geoff Dyson
Chris Brasher

2009 
Harold Abrahams
Malcolm Arnold
Steve Backley
Steve Cram
Jonathan Edwards
Ron Pickering
Ann Packer
Mary Rand
Alf Shrubb
Noel Thatcher
Dorothy Tyler
Sydney Wooderson

2010 
Paula Radcliffe
P.W. ‘JIMMY’ Green
John Le Masurier
Denis Watts
Walter George
Albert Hill
Linford Christie
Brendan Foster
Dame Kelly Holmes

2011–2013

2011 
Kathy Cook
Tom Hampson
Dorothy Hyman
Derek Ibbotson
Denise Lewis
Bruce Longden
Ken Matthews
Sam Mussabini
Jean Pickering
Harold Whitlock
Mike Smith

2012 
F.A.M Webster
Don Finlay
David Moorcroft
Chris Chataway
Tessa Sanderson
Fred Housden
Wilf Paish
Fatima Whitbread
Marea Hartman
Douglas Lowe

2013 
Sheila Lerwill
Alan Pascoe
Sir Ludwig Guttmann
Diane Leather
Jim Peters
Jack Holden
Mel Watman
Don Thompson
Gordon Pirie

2014-2016 

2014 
Bob Matthews
Sir Arthur Gold
Ron Hill
Muriel Cornell
George Gandy
Guy Butler
Ashia Hansen
George Bunner
Darren Campbell

2015 
Joan Allison
Peter Coe
Lillian Board
Basil Heatley
Peter Elliott
McDonald Bailey
Emil Voigt
Danny Crates
Roger Black

2016
Kriss Akabusi
Bud Baldaro
Judy Oakes
Peter Radford
Ron Roddan
Joyce Smith
Men’s 4x400m Relay Team at the 1991 World Championships in Athletics

2017-2019

2017
Godfrey Brown
Maurice Herriott
Carl Johnson
Derek Johnson
Arthur Rowe
Wendy Sly
Stuart Storey
Men’s 4x100m Relay Team at the 1912 Summer Olympics

2018
Geoff Capes
Jessica Ennis-Hill
Tommy Green
Peter Matthews
Katharine Merry
Aston Moore
John Regis

2019
Willie Applegarth
Jenny Archer
Robbie Brightwell
Paul Dickenson
Phillips Idowu
Christine Ohuruogu
Mark Rowland
Kelly Sotherton

See also
England Athletics
List of European Athletics Championships medalists (men)
List of European Athletics Championships medalists (women)

References

External links
England Athletics Hall of Fame

Athletics in England
Lists of track and field athletes
Sport of athletics awards
Sports halls of fame
Halls of fame in England
British sports trophies and awards
2008 establishments in England
Organizations established in 2008
Awards established in 2008